was a town located in Kitaakita District, Akita Prefecture, Japan.

History 
The name is believed to be a Japanized form of Pi-nay, the Ainu language term for 'pebble river’.

In 2003, the town had an estimated population of 11,665 and a density of 56.79 persons per km2. The total area was 205.39 km2.

On June 20, 2005, Hinai, along with the town of Tashiro (also from Kitaakita District), was merged into the expanded city of Ōdate.

References

External links
 Ōdate official website 

Dissolved municipalities of Akita Prefecture
Ōdate